Despina , also known as Neptune V, is the third-closest inner moon of Neptune. It is named after Greek mythological character Despoina, a nymph who was a daughter of Poseidon and Demeter.

Discovery 
Despina was discovered in late July 1989 from the images taken by the Voyager 2 probe. It was given the temporary designation S/1989 N 3. The discovery was announced (IAUC 4824) on 2 August 1989, and mentions "10 frames taken over 5 days", implying a discovery date of sometime before July 28. The name was given on 16 September 1991.

Physical characteristics 
Despina is irregularly shaped and shows no sign of any geological modification. It is likely that it is a rubble pile re-accreted from fragments of Neptune's original satellites, which were disrupted by perturbations from Triton soon after that moon's capture into a very eccentric initial orbit.

Orbit 
Despina's orbit lies close to but outside of the orbit of Thalassa and just inside the Le Verrier ring and acts as its shepherd moon. As it is also below Neptune's synchronous orbit radius, it is slowly spiralling inward due to tidal deceleration and may eventually impact Neptune's atmosphere, or break up into a planetary ring upon passing its Roche limit due to tidal stretching.

Notes

References

External links 
 Despina Profile by NASA's Solar System Exploration
 Neptune's Known Satellites (by Scott S. Sheppard)
 

Moons of Neptune
Astronomical objects discovered in 1989
Moons with a prograde orbit